Baptiste Rollier (born 27 August 1982) is a Swiss orienteering competitor.

He received a silver medal with the Swiss team in the relay event at the 2008 European Orienteering Championships in Ventspils, with Matthias Merz and Daniel Hubmann. He finished 6th in the long course.

He finished 11th in the long course at the 2007 World Orienteering Championships in Kyiv.

Rollier retired from international orienteering at the end of 2016.
Rollier competes in club competitions with Norwegian club Kristiansand OK.

Club competitions
In the 2008 season Rollier was a member of the Norwegian club Kristansand OK, and won the Tiomila relay with this club in 2008. He was previously a member of the Finnish club Vehkalahden Veikot.

References

External links
 
 

1982 births
Living people
Swiss orienteers
Male orienteers
Foot orienteers
World Orienteering Championships medalists